The Voûte-à-Minguet (Minguet cave) is a cave located in Dondon, Nord, Haiti,  with precolumbian petroglyphs and graffitis from the first Spanish and French settlers. 
It is now used for vodou ceremonies.

The cave is included in the National History Park and is one of Dondon's main touristic attraction.

History

The cave has been used by indigenous populations since ancient times, with the presence of petroglyphs attributed to the Taíno people. Moreau de Saint-Méry writes that caciques from many places went in the cave to pray for their gods.

Many artifacts (zemis) were found in the cave as reported by early visitors. However, the cave has never been thoroughly studied by archaeologists, since it has been plundered from all its artifacts since the 17th century.

Toponymy

The name of the cave is from the privateer André Minguet who is given ownership of the land in 1698. It is mistakenly said that the name comes from the creole word Minguette (Lily of the valley),

References

Caves of Haiti
Landforms of Haiti